The canton of Trois-Rivières is an administrative division in the department of Guadeloupe. Its borders were modified at the French canton reorganisation which came into effect in March 2015. Its seat is in Trois-Rivières.

Composition

It consists of the following communes :
Gourbeyre
Terre-de-Bas
Terre-de-Haut
Trois-Rivières
Vieux-Fort

Councillors

Pictures of the canton

See also
Cantons of Guadeloupe
Communes of Guadeloupe
Arrondissements of Guadeloupe

References

Cantons of Guadeloupe